Sanam Chai may refer to:

สนามชัย
 Sanam Chai Subdistrict in Tha Mai District, Chanthaburi
 Sanam Chai Subdistrict in Bang Sai District (1404), Phra Nakhon Si Ayutthaya
 Sanam Chai Subdistrict in Sathing Phra District, Songkhla
 Sanam Chai Subdistrict in Mueang Suphan Buri District
 Khlong Sanam Chai, a canal in Bangkok

สนามไชย
 Sanam Chai Road, a road in Bangkok
Sanam Chai MRT station, which serves the area